Gorenice  is a village in the administrative district of Gmina Olkusz, within Olkusz County, Lesser Poland Voivodeship, in southern Poland.

The village has an approximate population of 1,350.

References

External links 

Gorenice